Screaming Females is an American rock band from New Brunswick, New Jersey comprising Marissa Paternoster on guitar and vocals, Jarrett Dougherty on drums, and Mike Abbate on bass. They released their debut album Baby Teeth in 2006. The band have been featured on NPR, Last Call with Carson Daly, and MTV. They have played with bands such as Garbage, Throwing Muses,  Dinosaur Jr., The Dead Weather, Arctic Monkeys, Ted Leo & The Pharmacists and The Breeders.

History

Formation

Paternoster and Abbate formed a band in high school under the name Surgery On TV. After several lineup changes they finally became a trio with Dougherty and changed the name of the band to Screaming Females. The band got their start in the basement show scene of New Brunswick, New Jersey. In the basement show scene, concerts are held in the houses of various bands, students, and residents, so people under 21 can attend. Screaming Females self-released the albums Baby Teeth in 2006 and What If Someone Is Watching Their T.V.? in 2007. The band then signed with Don Giovanni Records, which later re-released these two early albums.

With Don Giovanni Records
The band's first album for Don Giovanni Records was Power Move in 2009, followed by Castle Talk in 2010. Their fifth album, Ugly was released in 2012 and was recorded by noted audio engineer Steve Albini.  The album received favorable reviews from The A.V. Club, Chicago Tribune, the Los Angeles Times, Pitchfork Media, Alternative Press and CMJ.

In 2012 Marissa Paternoster was named the 77th greatest guitarist of all time by Spin magazine. In 2013, Screaming Females released the self-produced EP Chalk Tape for streaming online. The EP was also sold as a limited run cassette tape and in a digital download format. The band wrote the songs for Chalk Tape  by laying out ideas on a chalkboard and then recording the songs with no rewrites. In September 2013, the band toured with label mates Waxahatchee and Tenement.

In early 2014, Screaming Females recorded a live record at the Hideout in Chicago. In a later interview, Paternoster described the experience: "The Hideout in Chicago is just one of those venues we really like, it's small, it's been around forever, it has a rich history, it's part of the community, it just seemed like a really good place to make a live record. Steve [Albini] drove two tape machines into the alleyway so we could record it live to tape. Like Deep Purple or something? Yeah! That's what was happening, there was a pro studio in the alleyway." The band released their sixth album Rose Mountain, produced by Matt Bayles, in February 2015. Their seventh album All at Once was released in February 2018. In 2019, a collection of singles titled Singles Too was released.

On January 17, 2023, the band released the single "Brass Bell", and announced the release of their eighth album Desire Pathway. The album is set to be released on February 17, 2023.

Band members
Marissa Paternoster – vocals, guitar 
Jarrett Dougherty – drums 
Mike "King Mike" Abbate – bass

Discography
Studio albums

Compilations

Live albums

Singles

EPs

References

External links
Screaming Females Homepage
Screaming Females Interview on VillageVoice.com
Screaming Females Interview on TheWaster.com
Interview on RollingStone.com
The Session Tape: Screaming Females LIVE
Screaming Females: Tiny Desk Concert (NPR)
Protonic Reversal ep:110 Marissa Paternoster, Jan - 2018

2005 establishments in New Jersey
American musical trios
Musical groups established in 2005
Musical groups from New Jersey
Don Giovanni Records artists
Punk blues musical groups